Temburong District Library (officially ) is a public library located in Bangar, Brunei. It is the only public library in Temburong District.

History 
The library was established on 8 December 1975, but for several years it had no dedicated building; the library was housed at a few temporary locations in the town of Bangar. The present building was only used from 22 July 1993 and has since been the permanent location of the library.

References 

Dewan Bahasa dan Pustaka Library
Libraries in Brunei
Temburong District
Libraries established in 1975
1975 establishments in Brunei